Brough Castle is a ruined castle near Brough, Caithness.   It is believed to date from the 12th to 14th centuries.

Description
The keep is not recognisable. The promontory tails away seawards to a shelf of rock. There appears to be no history of this castle.

See also
 Castle of Old Wick

References

External links
 Canmore record
 Caithness Castles: Brough Castle, Caithness

Ruined castles in Caithness